Alan Sánchez (born February 26, 1991) is a Mexican professional boxer based in Fairfield, California.

Sánchez is the former WBC Continental America's Welterweight Champion in association with Don Chargin Productions and Paco Presents.

Professional career
Sánchez fought on August 25, 2012, in Fairfield, California against welterweight contender Manuel Leyva winning via TKO stoppage in the 10th and final round, the main event of Solo Boxeo Tecate from the Allan Witt Sports Center.

Professional boxing record

|- style="margin:0.5em auto; font-size:95%;"
|align="center" colspan=8|20 wins (10 knockouts, 10 decisions), 4 losses (1 knockout, 3 decisions), 1 draw|- style="margin:0.5em auto; font-size:95%;"
|align=center style="border-style: none none solid solid; background: #e3e3e3"|Res.|align=center style="border-style: none none solid solid; background: #e3e3e3"|Record|align=center style="border-style: none none solid solid; background: #e3e3e3"|Opponent|align=center style="border-style: none none solid solid; background: #e3e3e3"|Type|align=center style="border-style: none none solid solid; background: #e3e3e3"|Rd., Time|align=center style="border-style: none none solid solid; background: #e3e3e3"|Date|align=center style="border-style: none none solid solid; background: #e3e3e3"|Location|align=center style="border-style: none none solid solid; background: #e3e3e3"|Notes'''
|-align=center
|-align=center
|Win|| 15-3-1 ||align=left| Ed Paredes
||| 10 ||   || align=left|  
|align=left|
|-align=center
|Win|| 14-3-1 ||align=left| José Luis Ramírez Jr.
||| 3 ||   || align=left|  
|align=left|
|-align=center
|Win|| 13-3-1 ||align=left| Jorge Silva
||| 6 ||   || align=left|  
|align=left|
|-align=center
|Loss|| 12-3-1 ||align=left| Luis Collazo
||| 10 ||   || align=left|  
|align=left| 
|align=left|
|-align=center
|Win|| 12-2-1 ||align=left| Miguel Angel Munguia
||| 2 ||   || align=left|  
|align=left|
|-align=center
|Win|| 11-2-1 ||align=left| Manuel Leyva
||| 10 ||   || align=left|  
|align=left|
|-align=center
|Win|| 10-2-1 ||align=left| Artemio Reyes
||| 1,2:08 ||   || align=left|  
|align=left|
|-align=center
|Win|| 9-2-1 ||align=left| Alberto Herrera
||| 8 ||   || align=left|  
|align=left|
|-align=center
|Win|| 8-2-1 ||align=left| Clint Coronel
||| 7,2:41 ||   || align=left|  
|align=left|
|-align=center
|Win|| 7-2-1 ||align=left| John Ryan Grimaldo
||| 8 ||   || align=left|  
|align=left|
|-align=center
|Win|| 6-2-1 ||align=left| Cristian Favela
||| 8 ||   || align=left|  
|align=left|
|-align=center
|style="background: #dae2f1"|Draw|| 5-2-1 ||align=left| Luis Grajeda
||| 8 ||   || align=left|  
|align=left|
|-align=center
|Loss|| 5-2-0 ||align=left| Artemio Reyes
||| 6 ||   || align=left|  
|align=left|
|-align=center
|Win|| 5-1-0 ||align=left| Alberto Morales
||| 5,0:35 ||   || align=left|  
|align=left|
|-align=center
|Loss|| 4-1-0 ||align=left| Ricky Duenas
||| 4 ||   || align=left|  
|align=left|
|-align=center
|Win|| 4-0-0 ||align=left| Raymundo Ortega
||| 4 ||   || align=left|  
|align=left|
|-align=center
|Win|| 3-0-0 ||align=left| Mikhail Lyubarsky
||| 2,1:06 ||   || align=left|  
|align=left|
|-align=center
|Win|| 2-0-0 ||align=left| Mario Angeles
||| 4 ||   || align=left|  
|align=left|
|-align=center
|Win|| 1-0-0 ||align=left| Jesse Isais
||| 4 ||   || align=left|  
|align=left|

References

External links

American boxers of Mexican descent
Welterweight boxers
Boxers from California
1991 births
Living people
People from Fairfield, California
American male boxers